Lousal mine was a pyrite mine in Portugal. The mine was opened in 1900 and closed in 1988.

References

Mines in Portugal
Iberian Pyritic Belt
1900 establishments in Portugal
1988 disestablishments
Buildings and structures in Setúbal District